Kristin Leigh DeDycker (born December 17, 1980) is an American soccer midfielder who last played for the Washington Freedom of Women's Professional Soccer.

References

External links
 Washington Freedom player profile
 WUSA player profile
 Denver player profile

1980 births
Living people
Sportspeople from Houston
Soccer players from Texas
Sportspeople from Littleton, Colorado
Soccer players from Colorado
Women's association football midfielders
American women's soccer players
Denver Pioneers women's soccer players
Atlanta Beat (WUSA) players
Mile High Edge players
Denver Diamonds players
Washington Freedom players
Women's United Soccer Association players
USL W-League (1995–2015) players
Women's Premier Soccer League players
Women's Professional Soccer players